Supermetric is a mathematical concept used in a number of fields in physics.

See also
Supergeometry
Supergravity
Super Minkowski space
Gauge gravitation theory

References

Further reading
 Deligne, P. and Morgan, J. (1999) Notes on supersymmetry (following Joseph Bernstein). In: Quantum Field Theory and Strings: A Course for Mathematicians, Vol. 1 (Providence, RI: Amer. Math. Soc.) pp. 41-97 .

External links 
G. Sardanashvily, Lectures on supergeometry, .

Supersymmetry